Zenn Kyi (born 25 August 1984) is a Burmese actor, scriptwriter, writer and singer. He is best known for his leading role in films Deception (2018) and Mudras Calling (2018), Now and Ever (2019), which propelled him to fame in Myanmar.

Early life and education
Zenn Kyi was born on 25 August 1980 in Mandalay, Burma (now Myanmar), but grew up and studied in New York City, United States, and returned to Myanmar in 2009. He graduated with a degree in music at City College of New York and Film Scoring at Institute of Audio Research.

Career
Zenn released his first solo album The Lost World in 2009. He made his acting debut with leading role in the 2018 film Mudras Calling alongside actress Hla Yin Kyae, directed by his wife Christina Kyi, and which premiered in Myanmar cinemas on 16 March 2018 which was a huge commercial success, topping film ratings and becoming the most hit film at that time.

In 2017, he starred in his second film Deception (Oo Pel Dan Myin) alongside Thet Mon Myint and Kaew Korravee. The film is directed by the same director of Mudras Calling, Christina Kyi, premiered in Myanmar cinemas on 19 January 2018 stayed in local theaters for a record seven weeks and was also screened in Singapore.

The two films was both a domestic hit, and led to increased recognition for Zenn Kyi. He was nominated for the 2018 Myanmar Academy Award for Best Actor.

Now & Ever (2019) earned 3.5 billion kyat at the box office in Myanmar, becoming one of the most successful domestic films of the decade.

Personal life
In 2006, Zenn married Christina Kyi, a film director. The couple have two sons; the firstborn son died young and the second son is named Noah.

Political views and activities
In 2019, Zenn Kyi and his wife publicly announced on their official Facebook pages that they are strong supporters of Aung San Suu Kyi who defended genocidal charges against Myanmar for the Rohingya genocide at the Criminal Court of Justice at the Hague.

On 17 April 2021, in the aftermath of the 2021 Myanmar coup d'état, Zenn Kyi and his wife Christina Kyi were detained at Yangon International Airport right before depart to Bangkok with MAI airline.

Filmography

Discography

Solo albums
 The Lost World (2009s)

Awards and nominations

Academy Awards

Other awards

References

External links

1984 births
Living people
21st-century Burmese male actors
People from Mandalay